Seignories have existed in Québec from 1627 until the British conquest of New France in 1763 and continued in the British colony of the Province of Quebec (1763–1791), then in Lower Canada (1840) and in the Province of Canada until 1854.

The numbering is based on the A.E.B. Courchene map.

See also 
Intendant of New France
Governor of New France
Governor of Lower Canada

Seigneurial system of New France

References

External links 

Quebec-related lists